Norway sent 74 athletes to the 2006 Winter Olympics in Turin, Italy. At the 2002 Winter Olympics Norway won the most gold medals, and before the Turin games, Norwegian sports officials were aiming for more than the 25 medals they won in Salt Lake City — the president of the Norwegian Skiing Federation Sverre Seeberg was quoted saying he thought Norway would win 25 medals in the skiing events alone (alpine skiing, cross-country skiing, freestyle skiing, Nordic combined and ski jumping). The Norwegian Olympic Committee aimed for Norway to be the best nation measured in the number of gold medals. However, Norway won only two gold medals in the games, the lowest amount since 1988.

In addition to the skiing events, Norway also qualified athletes in biathlon, curling, skeleton, snowboarding and speed skating. In addition to IOC qualifying times, the Norwegian Olympic Committee have required that athletes need to place themselves once in the top six or twice in the top twelve in major individual events in the sport to be selected. Curler Pål Trulsen served as flag bearer at the opening ceremony.

Medalists

|width="70%" align="left" valign="top"|

|width="30%" align="left" valign="top"|

Alpine skiing 

Note: In the men's combined, run 1 is the downhill, and runs 2 and 3 are the slalom. In the women's combined, run 1 and 2 are the slalom, and run 3 the downhill.

Biathlon 

Men

Women

Cross-country skiing 

On 9 January the selection of four male athletes for the sprint event was made public. Following the conclusion of the individual events at the 2006 Norwegian Championships, a further thirteen skiers were selected.

The Norwegian director of cross-country skiing sport, Bjørnar Håkensmoen, received "terribly many" reactions after he announced the team on 21 January, and the following day the newspaper Aftenposten asked him whether he "regretted" not selecting Petter Northug, who had won both the double pursuit and the relay (as part of a team representing Strindheim IL) at the Norwegian Skiing Championship.

Distance

Men

Women

Sprint

Curling 

The curling teams for men and women were nominated following the 2005 European Curling Championships, where Pål Trulsen and his team won gold for men, while Dordi Nordby finished fourth with her team.

Trulsen's team were the reigning Olympic champions, while Nordby had finished seventh in 2002 and fifth in 1998.

Men's

Team: Pål Trulsen (skip), Lars Vågberg, Flemming Davanger, Bent Ånund Ramsfjell, Torger Nergård (alternate)

Round Robin
Draw 1
;Draw 3
;Draw 4
;Draw 5
;Draw 6
;Draw 7
;Draw 9
;Draw 10
;Draw 11

Standings

Women's

Team: Dordi Nordby (skip), Marianne Haslum, Marianne Rørvik, Camilla Holth, Charlotte Hovring (alternate)

Round Robin
Draw 1
;Draw 2
;Draw 3
;Draw 4
;Draw 6
;Draw 7
;Draw 9
;Draw 11
;Draw 12

Standings

Playoffs
Semifinal
;Bronze Final

Key: The hammer indicates which team had the last stone in the first end.

Freestyle skiing

Nordic combined 

Note: 'Deficit' refers to the amount of time behind the leader a competitor began the cross-country portion of the event. Italicized numbers show the final deficit from the winner's finishing time.

Skeleton

Ski jumping 

Note: PQ indicates a skier was pre-qualified for the final, based on entry rankings.

Snowboarding 

Halfpipe

Note: In the final, the single best score from two runs is used to determine the ranking. A bracketed score indicates a run that wasn't counted.

Speed skating 

Men

Women

Team pursuit

Trivia

"Partly Norwegian" medal(ist)s

In the Norwegian media, two gold and one silver medal won by foreign athletes were humorously presented as part-Norwegian medals, since the medalists in question were of Norwegian descent or family:
 Women's snowboard cross gold medalist Tanja Frieden has a dual Swiss-Norwegian citizenship (mother is Norwegian) and speaks the language.
 Women's skeleton gold medalist Maya Pedersen, also of Switzerland, lives in Øyer, Norway, with her Norwegian husband, Snorre Pedersen.
 Women's 1,500 m speed skating silver medalist Kristina Groves, of Canada, is of Norwegian descent (many relatives in Stjørdal, Norway).

Grateful Canadian XC ski fans

A large group of Canadian winter sports fans was delighted and impressed by the Norwegian cross-country skiing sports director Bjørnar Håkensmoen's impulsive display of sportsmanship when he handed Canadian skier Sara Renner a ski pole only seconds after her own broke during the sprint relay. Renner and team mate Beckie Scott went on to win the silver medal (while the Norwegians placed fourth).

To show their appreciation, a group known as the "Independent Communications Dealers of Canada" mounted a "thank you" campaign called "Project Maple Syrup", organizing a shipment of 8,000 cans of maple syrup to Norway.

References 

  Disse er klare for OL, a list of the 63 athletes officially selected, from Nettavisen, retrieved 26 January 2006.

Nations at the 2006 Winter Olympics
2006 Winter Olympics
Olympics